Alan Tern Yoke Cher (born 31 March 1976) is a Singaporean actor. He was a full-time Mediacorp artiste from 2001 to 2011.

Career
Tern was a finalist in the 2001 Star Search Singapore, and he joined MediaCorp after the competition. He made his debut in the sitcom My Genie not long after signing on and also appeared in The Hotel. Tern's acting in Double Happiness earned him a Best Supporting Actor Award nomination at the Star Awards 2005.

Tern left the entertainment industry as he has announced his decision to leave MediaCorp after filming A Song to Remember, in which he played the abusive husband of his wife's character. He did not rule a return to acting but stated that he wanted to concentrate on running his business for the time being.

Personal life
Tern was educated at The Chinese High School and Hwa Chong Junior College. Prior to joining Star Search he graduated from Nanyang Technological University with a degree in accountancy.

Tern currently runs his own eyewear business. He married actress Priscelia Chan on 6 October 2007.

Filmography

Television

Shows

Accolades

Notes and references

External links

Profile on xin.msn.com

Living people
Singaporean male television actors
Singaporean people of Teochew descent
Hwa Chong Junior College alumni
Hwa Chong Institution alumni
Nanyang Technological University alumni
1976 births